Mukawwa Island is a small shore island of the Red Sea, at the northern entrance to Foul Bay in the Red Sea Governorate of Egypt.

It is one of a small group of islands which in Foul Bay, including Rocky Island and St. John's Island. 

It is believed that it was once part of mainland Egypt and connected through Râs Banas, that however became separated through either erosion or rising sea levels

Notes

Islands of Egypt
Islands of the Red Sea
Red Sea Governorate